Highams Park is a railway station on the Chingford branch of the Lea Valley lines, located in Highams Park in the London Borough of Waltham Forest, north-east London. It has been operated by London Overground since 2015.

The station is in Travelcard Zone 4.

History 
The station was originally named "Hale End" upon opening in 1873, and was renamed in 1894 as "Highams Park & Hale End".

The present station, to the design of Neville Ashbee, was inaugurated in 1903.

Services
Trains are operated by London Overground.

The typical off-peak weekday service pattern is:
4 trains per hour (tph) to London Liverpool Street;
4 tph to Chingford.
New Class 710 trains have entered service with one unit on this line and another 2 for Enfield and Cheshunt. More of these entered service in 2020.

Level crossing 
A level crossing that connects Larkshall Road with Hale End Road is situated just to the south of the station. The crossing is worked by the signal box at Liverpool Street. There are three ways to cross the line: the footbridge in the station, the subway at the south end of the station which links to the level crossing, and the level crossing itself.

Connections 
London Buses routes 212, 275, W16 and 675 serve the station.

References

External links 

Railway stations in the London Borough of Waltham Forest
Former Great Eastern Railway stations
Railway stations in Great Britain opened in 1873
Railway stations served by London Overground